Gavkhuni Rural District is a rural district (dehestan) in Bon Rud District, Isfahan County, Isfahan Province, Iran. At the 2006 census, its population was 6,833, in 1,760 families.  The rural district has over 10 villages.

References 

Rural Districts of Isfahan Province
Isfahan County